Johnny Hamilton (22 January 1935 – 8 August 2013) was a Scottish footballer, who played for Hearts, Watford and Berwick Rangers.

He scored 157 goals in 496 appearances for Hearts between 1955 and 1967.

Hamilton played for the Scottish League XI once, in 1958. After retiring as a football player, Hamilton coached the Hearts youth team between 1974 and 1979. He then ran a newsagents in Slateford Road, Edinburgh. Hamilton died in August 2013, aged 78.

Johnny married Elzabeth Farquhar and had 3 children, Karen, Ross and Gary

References

External links 

1935 births
2013 deaths
Sportspeople from Larkhall
Association football wingers
Scottish footballers
Heart of Midlothian F.C. players
Watford F.C. players
Berwick Rangers F.C. players
Scottish Football League players
English Football League players
Scottish Football League representative players
Footballers from South Lanarkshire
Scotland under-23 international footballers
Lesmahagow F.C. players
Scottish Junior Football Association players